Chuluaqui Quodoushka (CHOO-la-kway Kwuh-DOE-shka) is a collection of sexual techniques and theories developed and promoted by the Deer Tribe Medicine Society, a New Age new religious movement and business co-founded by Harley Reagan and Diane Reagan in 1986. Harley Reagan cites a variety of ancient and contemporary cultures as the inspiration for these practices, including the Olmec, the Mayan and the Toltec, though he formerly claimed that the practices were Cherokee. He has come under heavy criticism and his teachings have been denounced by the tribes whose ways he has claimed to teach.

Overview
According to Reagan and his followers, the "Quodoushka teachings" (also known as "the "Q" to adherents), guided exercises and rituals allow a person to improve relationships and reach "higher levels" of orgasm and sexual ecstasy. Demonstrations at Chuluaqui Quodoushka retreats include male and female self-pleasuring techniques, close-up examinations to show variations in the shapes of genitalia, and participants having sexual intercourse while Reagan and other trainers watch and "coach" them.

Criticism
The sexual rites of passage that Reagan says are drawn from spiritual practices of the Olmec, Mayan and Toltec cultures, and what he claims are secret societies within the Cherokee Nation, have been denounced as fraudulent by the traditional teachers of these cultures. Many cultures contain rites of passage—usually social and spiritual ceremonies held as a child enters adulthood. Reagan claims to take inspiration from these ceremonies. But his critics agree that his claims about these ceremonies starkly contrast with the teachings and beliefs of the cultures he claims to represent. The Cherokee Nation disavows Reagan's claims entirely, noting that Reagan is not an enrolled member of the Cherokee Nation nor a member of any Cherokee community. After being denounced by the Cherokee Nation, Reagan abruptly changed his story and now claims the teachings are inspired by a variety of cultures.

Language
In the workshops a woman's genitalia are called "tupuli", which Reagan claims is a Cherokee term for "sacred black hole of creation," and a man's genitalia are called "tipilli", which Reagan says is a Cherokee term meaning "like a tipi pole." According to Durbin Feeling, a linguistic specialist for the Cherokee Nation, there are no such words in the Cherokee language, and Cherokee do not and never have lived in tipis. In fact, the word "tipili" applied to genitals is likely taken from Gary Jennings's novel Aztec. Feeling said Chu-Lua-Qui refers to Cherokee people; he said the closest translation he could find for Quodoushka is "(a)qwv-tol u- ska", a graphic term for a male sexual organ that has nothing to do with Cherokee spirituality. "It's pretty ugly. I don't know if he [Harley Reagan] realizes what it means." Feeling added, "He probably does know what it means."

Credentials
Despite the claims that the Chuluaqui Quodoushka is based on ancient traditions, there is no evidence of this. Much of the ancient Maya religious tradition is still not understood by scholars and there is no surviving information about Mayan sex rituals. The Olmecs were a people in Mexico who predated the Aztecs. Their culture disappeared and the only clues left about them are some stone statues and hieroglyphic carvings. Olmec mythology has left no documents and therefore cannot have anything to do with modern-day sex rituals. Reagan also claims without evidence that the teachings are also Toltec in origin.

The Cherokee Nation firmly denies any involvement in the Chuluaqui-Quodoushka. Harley Reagan appeared on the HBO program "Real Sex in America" in 1992, promoting Quodoushka as a Cherokee ritual. The chief of the Cherokee Nation of Oklahoma at the time, Wilma Mankiller, threatened to sue HBO for misrepresentation, and the Cherokee passed a resolution condemning Reagan and other "plastic shamans". Some believe that in order to avoid a lawsuit, Reagan changed his story to the claim that Quodoushka is a blend of many ancient sexual traditions.

Richard Allen, a research and policy analyst of the Cherokee Nation, says of the Chuluaqui Quodoushka, "Reagan's made it up. We learn about sex like everyone else does, behind the barn."

Proponents
One of the fans of the "Q" is porn star Porsche Lynn, who studied with Harley Reagan and has praised the "Q" workshops.

In film
The movie Quodoushka, Native American Love Techniques (or Quodoushka) came out in 1991, distributed by Vivid Video and starring such hardcore porn actors as Ashley Nicole, Heather Hart, Hyapatia Lee and Madison. Lee was a student of Harley Reagan and claims to be of Cherokee descent. The film is a pornographic film made to look like a documentary. It depicts various women of supposedly Cherokee ancestry copulating in various ways, mostly with white men.

Notes

References
 Chuluaqui-Quodoushka I, II, III Manual and outline.
 New Age Frauds and Plastic Shamans website
 
 The Institute for Contemporary Shamanic Studies page on Quodoushka
 http://articles.baltimoresun.com/1993-01-27/news/1993027046_1_cherokee-nation-indian-tribe
 Encyclopedia of women and religion in North America, Volume 1 By Rosemary Skinner Keller, Rosemary Radford Ruether, Marie Cantlon

External links
Official Deer Tribe Medicine Society website

New Age practices
Sexuality and religion